Die Gespenstersonate is a 1984 German-language opera by Aribert Reimann to a libretto by the composer and Uwe Schendel after August Strindberg's play The Ghost Sonata. Strindberg's play also inspired another opera, Die Gespenstersonate by Julius Weismann (1930).

Premiere
World premiere by the Deutsche Oper Berlin at the Hebbel Theater in Berlin with the Junge Deutsche Philharmonie and Ensemble Modern featured:
 Der Alte – Hans Günther Nöcker 
 Die Mumie – Martha Mödl
 Der Oberst – Horst Hiestermann
 Der Student Arkenholz – David Knutson
 Das Fräulein – Gudrun Sieber
 Johansson – Donald Grobe
 Bengtsson – William Dooley
 Die Dunkle Dame – Barbara Scherler
 Die Köchin – Kaja Borris

A video of the premiere was released on DVD by Arthaus

References

1984 operas
Operas by Aribert Reimann
German-language operas
Operas
Operas based on plays
Operas based on works by August Strindberg